C. Adam Bittinger (November 28, 1943 – November 9, 2010) was a Democratic member of the Pennsylvania House of Representatives. He was born in Franklin County, PA and attended York College. He worked as a news reporter, radio talk show host and was a police officer for 22 years. He was elected to the Pennsylvania House of Representatives for the 1977 term. He died in 2010 in Florida.

References

Democratic Party members of the Pennsylvania House of Representatives
2010 deaths
1943 births